The Sudanese passport is issued to citizens of Sudan for international travel.

The Republic of the Sudan started issuing electronic passports to citizens in May 2009. The new electronic passport will be issued in three categories:

 The citizen's passport (ordinary passport) will be issued to ordinary citizens and will contain 48 pages. This passport is valid for ten years.
 Businessmen and women who need to travel often will be issued a commercial passport that will contain 64 pages. This passport is valid for seven years.
 Smaller passports that contain 32 pages only will be issued to children.

The microprocessor chip will contain the holder's information. The cost of a new passport for adults will be approximately SDG10000 in 2021.
These new passports are blue in colour and prior to this they were green and did not contain a microchip.

Sudanese Passport Features
Sudanese passports are dark blue in color, with a gilded falcon in the center of the front cover. Below the logo is the word "passport" and جواز سفر (in English: Passport). The Sudanese passport contains 62 pages, and because Arabic is a written language from right to left, the passport opening starts from right to left. As for the new electronic passports, they are of a dark blue color, with the same design as the green passport.

Issuing Authorities
Ordinary passports are issued by the Ministry of the Interior (Passports, Immigration and Nationality Administration), or from consulates and Sudanese embassies outside Sudan. As for the new electronic passports, they are what are currently being issued. No information is available yet on the availability of new passports outside Sudan.
Types of Sudanese passports are:

 Diplomatic passports,
 Private passports,
 Passports for a mission,
 Ordinary passports,
 Commercial passports.
 Passports for foreign affairs.

Passport Pages content
In the electronic passport, the information of the passport holder appears on the first page of the passport, and the information is in the following order:

 Passport number 1234356
 National number 655
 The place of issuance is redundant
 Issue date 1:00 pm - 1:00 pm
 End date 6-15
 Issuing authority 5
 A photo of the passport holder
 Barcode (serial number + number of issuing authority)
 Title (in Arabic)
 Reading machine symbols

Passport Languages 
Sudanese passports are issued in both Arabic and English.

See also
 Visa requirements for Sudanese citizens

References

Passports by country
Government of Sudan